Anyimon is a town located in the mid-western part of Ghana. It is in the Berekum Municipal District of the Brong-Ahafo Region of Ghana.

Notable people 
Kwadwo Afari-Gyan, the former Chairman of the Electoral Commission of Ghana.

Populated places in the Central Region (Ghana)